Saúl Villalobos Gutiérrez (born 26 June 1991) is a Mexican former footballer who played sparingly as a midfielder with teams in Liga MX and Ascenso MX, the top two tiers of the Mexican football league system.

Career
Villalobos began his playing career in the Atlas youth teams in 2006. He managed to break into the first team on 4 November 2009, during a 1–0 loss to Puebla.

Villalobos played for the Mexico U-20 team at the 2011 FIFA U-20 World Cup finals in Colombia.

Honours
Mexico U20
CONCACAF U-20 Championship: 2011
FIFA U-20 World Cup 3rd Place: 2011

References

External links
 
 
 

1991 births
Living people
Footballers from Jalisco
Mexico under-20 international footballers
Liga MX players
Atlas F.C. footballers
Club León footballers
Tecos F.C. footballers
Club Puebla players
Association football midfielders
Mexican footballers